Paul Schneider (August 4, 1923 – October 13, 2008) was an American screenwriter who worked in television and film between the 1950s and the 1980s.

Star Trek

Schneider is probably best remembered for two episodes of the original Star Trek series: "Balance of Terror" and "The Squire of Gothos". The first of these introduced the Romulans - which became one of the main alien races in the Star Trek universe. The second episode introduces a "Q"-like lifeform which terrorizes the crew.  He also wrote the episode "The Terratin Incident" for the animated Star Trek series.

Filmography 

Schneider wrote for several other films and television series, including Mr. Magoo, Bonanza, Ironside, The Six Million Dollar Man and Buck Rogers in the 25th Century.

Films

Television

References

External links
 

American science fiction writers
American television writers
American male television writers
American male novelists
American male screenwriters
20th-century American novelists
1923 births
2008 deaths
20th-century American male writers
20th-century American screenwriters